Abdelkader Benali (born 25 November 1975 in Ighazzazen, Morocco) is a Moroccan-Dutch writer and journalist.

When he was four years old, he and his family, of Berber background, migrated to The Netherlands and settled in Rotterdam, where his father worked as a butcher. When he was twenty-one his debut novel Bruiloft aan zee (Wedding by the Sea) appeared and was a huge critical and commercial success. It was translated into many languages. He received the Libris Prize for his second novel, De langverwachte ("The Long-Awaited").

In addition to novels and plays, Benali has published essays and reviews in respected newspapers and magazines including De Volkskrant, Vrij Nederland, De Groene Amsterdammer, Esquire and Algemeen Dagblad. Benali is an avid long-distance runner, his personal record being 2:52:19, achieved at the 2007 Rotterdam Marathon. He also wrote a book about his failed attempt to improve his best result, Marathonloper (Marathon Runner).

Abdelkader Benali has mastered Dutch, and speaks Berber and English. He is irreligious, despite his family's Muslim faith and tradition. He is a promoter of the Great Replacement conspiracy theory which is often associated with the far-right, though he believes it to be a positive.

Works (in English translation) 

 •	Abdelkader Benali: Wedding by the sea. Transl. by Susan Massotty. London, Phoenix House, 1999.

References

External links
"I migrated to Europe with hope. Now I feel nothing but dread: As the Dutch ban the burqa, one of Holland's leading writers mourns the passing of a welcoming continent". Abdelkader Benali. The Observer. 3 October 2010.
Europe's complex new fear of immigrants

1975 births
Living people
21st-century Dutch novelists
Dutch journalists
Libris Prize winners
Moroccan writers
Berber writers
Dutch people of Riffian descent
Dutch people of Moroccan-Berber descent
Moroccan emigrants to the Netherlands
Writers from Rotterdam
Dutch male novelists
21st-century Dutch male writers
Dutch former Muslims